Stephen Michael Goldfeld (August 9, 1940 – August 25, 1995) was a Princeton University economics professor and provost who served on the Council of Economic Advisers during the Carter administration.

Goldfeld received a bachelor's degree from Harvard University in 1960 at the age of twenty and a doctorate in economics from the Massachusetts Institute of Technology in 1963 at the age of twenty three, when he joined the Princeton faculty. As an academic he specialized in financial institutions and in econometrics. He was an associate editor of the American Economic Review and other major economic journals. He died in 1995 at the age of 55 of lung cancer.

Noted publications

References 

Econometricians
1995 deaths
1940 births
Fellows of the Econometric Society
Harvard University alumni
20th-century American economists
MIT School of Humanities, Arts, and Social Sciences alumni
United States Council of Economic Advisers